Cemento Cruz Azul is a  cement company in Mexico. It was founded more than a century ago, during 1881, by a British businessman named Henry Gibbon.

On May 22, 1927, the company's workers organized the Club Deportivo Cruz Azul football club, which has gone on to become one of the most famous association football teams in Mexico, winning nine national and seven international titles. The soccer team's association leads to the nickname of La Máquina Cementera or the cement locomotive. Along with Coca-Cola and Bimbo bread, Cemento Cruz Azul are among the most frequent emblems on Mexican soccer jerseys.

With the creation of the North American Free Trade Agreement (NAFTA) in 1994, the company enjoyed the benefits of being able to transport across North America. It is now a well known cement company internationally.

Cemento Cruz Azul has faced stiff competition from Mexico's other leading cement producer, Cemex, a company which has gone on to set foot on other countries, such as Puerto Rico (Cemex Puerto Rico), the United States and the United Kingdom.

History
In 1881, Englishman Henry Gibbon rented a portion of the old Hacienda City of Jasso, Hidalgo, and installed a hydraulic lime factory. By 1883, fellow Englishman Joseph (or George) Watson, heavily invested into the factory and business.  Despite the efficient mining of the rich deposits of limestone minerals from the Hidalgo region, the business practically did not develop due to lack of capital and was bankrupt by 1906.

Cement robbery
It was reported on December 21, 2020, that three people connected to a man named Billy Alvarez were being sought, accused of committing fraud to illegally obtain ten thousand tons of Cemento Cruz Azul cement.

Oaxaca attack 
On July 27, 2021, a video surfaced where some 30 people are seen illegally entering the Cruz Azul Oaxaca plant and shooting the place. No injuries were reported in the incident.

References

Cement companies of Mexico
Companies established in 1881
Manufacturing companies based in Mexico City
Mexican brands
Cooperatives in Mexico
1881 establishments in Mexico